Domingo de Alzola (1532 – February 15, 1590) was a Roman Catholic prelate who served as Bishop of Guadalajara (1582–1590).

Biography
Domingo de Alzola was born in Mondragón, Spain and ordained a priest in the Order of Preachers. On October 1, 1582, he was appointed by the King of Spain and confirmed by Pope Gregory XIII as Bishop of Guadalajara. On October 19, 1582, he was consecrated bishop. He served as Bishop of Guadalajara until his death on February 15, 1590.

References

External links and additional sources
 (for Chronology of Bishops)
 (for Chronology of Bishops)

1532 births
1590 deaths
Bishops appointed by Pope Gregory XIII
Dominican bishops
People from Mondragón
16th-century Roman Catholic bishops in Mexico